Alexander zu Dohna-Schlobitten may refer to:
 Alexander zu Dohna-Schlobitten (1661–1728), Prussian field marshal and diplomat
 Alexander zu Dohna-Schlobitten (1899–1997), German soldier, businessman and author